The molecular formula C21H24O9 (molar mass: 420.41 g/mol, exact mass: 420.1420 u) may refer to:

 Isorhapontin, a stilbenoid glucoside
 Rhaponticin, a stilbenoid glucoside

Molecular formulas